Cowper County, New South Wales is one of the 141 Cadastral divisions of New South Wales.

Cowper County is named in honour of the politician and Premier of New South Wales, Sir Charles Cowper (1807-1875).

It is located to the south-east of Bourke, with the Darling River the boundary to the northwest, and the Bogan River the boundary to the northeast.

Parishes within this county
A full list of parishes found within this county; their current LGA and mapping coordinates to the approximate centre of each location is as follows:

References

Counties of New South Wales